The Stanton Carnegie Library, in Stanton, Nebraska, was built in 1915.  It was listed on the National Register of Historic Places in 2018.

References

Libraries in Nebraska
Carnegie libraries in Nebraska
National Register of Historic Places in Stanton County, Nebraska
Library buildings completed in 1915